Memići may refer to the following places in Bosnia and Herzegovina:

 Memići (Čelinac)
 Memići (Kalesija)